Lulu Wilson (born October 7, 2005) is an American actress known mostly for the horror films Ouija: Origin of Evil (2016) and Annabelle: Creation (2017), as well as the television series adaptation of The Haunting of Hill House (2018). She was cast as Gloria Steinem and plays the role of her teenage years in the movie The Glorias (2020).

Early life
Wilson was born in the Upper East Side neighborhood of New York City's Manhattan borough on October 7, 2005. She has two older sisters.

Career
Wilson started acting in commercials at the age of three. She has been cast mostly in supernatural horror films such as Deliver Us from Evil, Ouija: Origin of Evil, and Annabelle: Creation. She was also cast in the Marvel Studios film Doctor Strange, but her scene was cut for pacing purposes.

Filmography

Film

Television

References

External links
 

2005 births
Living people
21st-century American actresses
Actresses from New York City
American child actresses
American film actresses
American television actresses
People from the Upper East Side